Ain't Love Grand is the fifth studio album by American rock band X, released in July 1985 by Elektra Records. The album was their first not produced by Ray Manzarek. It was reissued with four bonus tracks by Rhino Records in 2002. The album included the minor radio hit "Burning House of Love", which the band performed on American Bandstand in September 1985, their largest television exposure to date. The album also includes a cover of the Small Faces song "All or Nothing". Lead guitarist Billy Zoom left the band after this album but he later returned to the group in 1998 during a tour and the original line-up released their next full-length studio album in 2020 with Alphabetland.

Track listing

 "All or Nothing" is listed as a bonus track on the 2002 reissue

Personnel
X
Exene Cervenka – vocals
Billy Zoom – guitar, saxophone
D.J. Bonebrake – drums, percussion
John Doe – vocals, bass guitar

Charts

References

X (American band) albums
1985 albums
Albums produced by Michael Wagener
Elektra Records albums